XHTSC-FM is a Mexican college radio station owned by the Instituto Tecnológico Superior de Cananea in the state of Sonora. The station broadcasts on 102.3 MHz and is known as Radio Tecnológico.

History
XHTSC received its permit in 2012 after more than 10 years of the university attempting to get a radio station.

References

Radio stations in Sonora
University radio stations in Mexico